Luce is a 2019 American social thriller drama film directed, co-produced, and co-written by Julius Onah. It stars Naomi Watts, Octavia Spencer, Kelvin Harrison Jr., and Tim Roth. The film was based on the play of the same name by J.C. Lee, and tells the story of a couple (Watts and Roth) forced to reconsider their marriage and their family after an extremely disturbing essay written by their adopted son (Harrison Jr.) is brought to their attention by his teacher (Spencer).

Principal photography took place in New York and Los Angeles, California and the film was shot on 35mm film.

Luce had its world premiere at the Sundance Film Festival on January 27, 2019 and was released in cinemas on August 2, 2019 by NEON. It received positive reviews from critics, who praised the cast's performances, Onah's direction, the writing, and the film's themes. The film made over $2.3 million worldwide.

The film received multiple nominations from the various award organizations including the Black Reel Awards and various critics organizations, including the Hollywood Critics Association and the San Diego Film Critics Society Awards.

Plot
Born in war-torn Eritrea and adopted in the United States, Luce Edgar is an all-star high school athlete and accomplished public speaker who is adored by other students and his adoptive parents, Peter and Amy. However, he has animosity towards his history teacher, Harriet Wilson, who got his friend DeShaun kicked off the running team after finding marijuana in his locker.

Amy meets with Harriet, who shows her Luce has written a paper about political revolutionary Frantz Fanon, arguing that colonialism can be overcome through violence. Luce was a child soldier before coming to America, and Harriet is concerned. Harriet also reveals to Amy that she found a bag of illegal fireworks in Luce's locker.

Amy and Peter decide to not say anything to Luce, hiding the paper and fireworks. When asked about his teacher, Luce accuses Wilson of harmfully singling out students, such as using Stephanie Kim, a Korean-American classmate rumored to have been sexually abused, as an example of a victim suffering in silence. Luce is Harriet's shining example of a star black student, but he argues that he does not want to be tokenized. Luce finds the hidden paper and fireworks.

Luce and Wilson discuss his paper. He says he just did the assignment, disavowing any true belief in violence. He makes a comment about fireworks that Harriet interprets as a threat, and she notifies Peter. He and Amy confront Luce. He explains that the track team shares lockers and the fireworks are not his. Peter thinks Luce is lying, but Amy is not sure.

Harriet and her sister Rosemary, who suffers from an unspecified mental illness, have an encounter with Luce that unsettles Harriet.

Luce promises DeShaun that he will make things right. Meanwhile, Amy and Stephanie meet at a coffee shop. Stephanie says that she used to date Luce, which Amy never knew, but they broke up. Stephanie describes being sexually assaulted at a party by several boys. Luce stopped them and comforted her after she awoke. Luce later learns from Stephanie about the visit.

Rosemary arrives at the school looking for Harriet and has a breakdown, stripping naked in front of a crowd before she is tasered and apprehended by police. Harriet's home is vandalized that night, and Stephanie arrives shortly after to tell Harriet that Luce sexually assaulted her. Harriet informs Principal Towson, and a meeting is organized with Luce, and his parents. Luce disproves Harriet's accusations with video evidence of his whereabouts, and Harriet's harsh questions quickly make Amy and Peter take their son's side. Harriet discovers that Stephanie has left before she could repeat her accusation to Towson. Towson lets Luce go, despite Harriet still arguing her side.

At night, exploding fireworks inside Harriet's desk cause a fire. Towson puts Harriet on a leave of absence pending investigation. Learning of the incident, Amy discovers that the fireworks in their home are gone. Peter believes Luce was involved, but Amy insists that they will stand up for their son.

Luce turns up at Wilson's with flowers, saying he feels uncomfortable about her losing her job. However, he contradicts this by confronting her about ruining DeShaun's athletic career and putting Luce on a pedestal. She accuses Luce of being hypocritical, protecting himself by using other minority students, including Stephanie, to "run his errands" of subterfuge against her. Luce argues "that is not the same thing" but does not deny the facts of which he is accused.

Amy follows Luce to a hideout where he has sex with Stephanie. When Amy returns home, Luce arrives and duplicitously reconciles with her. Later, Luce gives a speech at school, thanking Amy and Peter for raising him and saying how lucky he feels to be an American, with the chance to start over and tell his own story.

Afterwards, Luce goes on a jog, during which his face contorts with rage.

Cast

Production
In November 2017, it was announced Naomi Watts, Octavia Spencer, Kelvin Harrison Jr., and Tim Roth had joined the cast of the film, with Julius Onah directing from a screenplay by himself and JC Lee. John Baker, Onah, and Andrew Yang served as producers on the film with Rob Feng, Amber Wang, and Lee served as executive producers under their Dream Factory Group banner. In December 2017, Brian Bradley, also known as Stro, joined the cast of the film.
Onah spoke about the importance of rehearsal with actors to his process. The actors rehearsed with each other before filming to create deeper familiarity, this includes a rehearsal in which all the young actors joined up in New York to hang out and develop a deeper backstory and understanding of their characters. The film was shot on 35mm film.

Release
The film had its world premiere at the Sundance Film Festival on January 27, 2019. Shortly after, NEON & Topic Studios acquired distribution rights to the film. It was released on August 2, 2019, and came out on VOD by Universal Home Entertainment on October 29, 2019.

Reception

Box office
Luce grossed $2 million in the United States and Canada, and $0.3 million in other territories, for a worldwide total of $2.3 million, plus $76,183 with home video sales.

Critical response
 

The Guardians Benjamin Lee said of Kelvin Harrison Jr.'s performance, "It's an utterly mesmeric turn, filled with crushing vulnerability and insidious menace, in a brutal, dramatically explosive film that challenges preconceptions and leaves us with difficult, troubling questions to consider." Critic Brian Tallerico of RogerEbert.com praised the film, commenting, "It reminded me of early Mamet work although with a commentary on race he could never attempt. All of this, and it's got one of the best ensemble performances of Sundance 2019. This is one to watch for." He went on to specifically praise Harrison Jr.'s performance as "the real deal... flat out brilliant."

Accolades

See also
List of black films of the 2010s

References

External links
 
 
 

2019 films
2019 drama films
2019 thriller drama films
2010s American films
2010s coming-of-age films
2010s English-language films
African-American drama films
American coming-of-age films
Coming-of-age drama films
Films about adoption
Films about racism
Films directed by Julius Onah
Films set in Virginia
Films set in 2018
Neon (distributor) films
Topic Studios films